The Petőfi Literary Museum (PLM) is a major Hungarian museum in Budapest. It was founded in 1954, as the successor organisation to Petőfi House. It was named to honour the memory of Sándor Petőfi.

References

External links
Petőfi Literary Museum within Google Arts & Culture

Museums in Budapest
Literary museums